Gad Elmaleh (born 19 April 1971) is a Moroccan-Canadian stand-up comedian and actor who achieved fame in France, Morocco and the United States. He is best known in the French-speaking world and more recently in the United States.

He has starred in several feature films, including Coco, Priceless, La Doublure and Midnight in Paris. Voted the funniest person in France, he was named knight of the Order of Arts and Letters by the Minister of Culture; he was also named knight of the National Order of Quebec. In 2015 and 2018, Elmaleh did national comedy tours across the United States. In 2019, he starred in the Netflix series Huge in France.

Early years 
Elmaleh was born and raised in Casablanca to a Moroccan Berber Jewish family. Elmaleh was brought up in a culturally diverse environment, speaking Moroccan Arabic and French. As a child he would introduce his father, a mime, with a placard. His brother, Arié, is an actor and singer, and his sister, Judith, is an actress and stage director.

He studied at École Maïmonide, and Lycée Lyautey in Casablanca. His family emigrated from Morocco to Canada when Elmaleh was 17. He later studied political science at a university in Montreal (it is unclear whether at the University of Montreal or McGill University, as both institutions' records reflect his attendance) for four years but did not graduate. In 1992, Elmaleh moved to Paris to study drama at Cours Florent under the tutelage of Isabelle Nanty.

Career

Comedy 

Elmaleh's first one-man show Décalages, performed at the "Palais des glaces" in 1997, was autobiographical. In the show he retraces his journey beginning with his departure from Morocco after high school, continuing with his studies in Montreal and finishing in France where he studied drama at Cours Florent.  His fame further increased with the success of his second one-man show, La Vie Normale which was his first time performing at the Olympia as well his first show of more than two hours. The show was released on DVD on 23 January 2001.

In contrast to his first two one-man shows, his L'autre c'est moi (2005) contains more improvisation and interaction with the public. He has been credited with bringing the American stand-up style to France and using it in his one-man shows. He came back to the stage with L'autre, c'est moi in September 2006 in Canada (Montreal) and in the U.S. (on Broadway, at the Beacon Theatre in front of 3000 spectators); it was performed also in Casablanca, Morocco. Between April and August 2007 he played his successful show in France, Belgium, and Switzerland. The show attracted over 300,000 spectators. The show was later released on DVD and sold 1,500,000 copies.

On 6 January 2007, he was voted the "funniest man of the year" by TF1 viewers from a choice of 50 comedians. On 15 July 2007, Elmaleh premiered his fifth one-man show, Papa est en haut, in Montreal as part of the Just for Laughs festival. That year he sold out seven consecutive weeks at the iconic Olympia theatre in Paris, a new record. After that Gad performed for another seven sold out weeks at Le Palais des Sports. In total, one million tickets were sold to this show.

In 2013, he appeared on Jerry Seinfeld's Comedians in Cars Getting Coffee.

His sixth standup show was Sans Tambour (Drumless, "sans tambour ni trompette" (bugleless) = meaning making a big entrance unannounced).

In 2016, he appeared with Kev Adams in the M6 comedy special Tout est Possible. During the show, the two comedians performed a 10-minute sketch where they played Chinese men, which later received criticism for its racial portrayals.

Elmaleh has performed in a mix of French and Arabic in Morocco and included some Hebrew in shows in Israel. Elmaleh is often called the "Seinfeld of France," a label he called "flattering" and understandable, given that both he and Seinfeld are inspired to do comedy based on "everyday life." Both comedians are friends.

Move to the United States 

In 2015 Elmaleh began an American tour entitled "Oh My Gad" and moved to New York City. He first appeared in Joe's Pub in December following multiple workout shows in the fall. While Elmaleh speaks English fluently, he works with an English teacher to write his jokes while appreciating the nuances of the English language. One difference between his French shows and his English shows is that his English shows include no riffing, everything is scripted. In September 2016, an episode of This American Life highlighting challenging transitions included a segment about Elmaleh and his transition to American comedy.

On 15 December 2016 episode of The Late Show with Stephen Colbert, Elmaleh appeared as the show's stand-up act.

Elmaleh's French stand-up special Gad Gone Wild was filmed in Montreal, Canada and was released on Netflix on 24 January 2017. An English language special was released in March 2018.

Acting 
Elmaleh's first contact with cinema was the full-length film, Salut cousin ! by Merzak Allouache. He later appeared in L'homme est une femme comme les autres and Train de Vie. In 2000 he played the role of "Dov", the seducer in La Vérité si je mens ! 2. The character of "Chouchou" in La Vie Normale was reproduced in the comedy Chouchou (2002), directed by Merzak Allouache and also starring Alain Chabat; the film drew large audiences.. He then did his debut as a singer in "it's kiz my life", a popular song in a non-existing language. The music video was directed by J.G Biggs and shot in the famous Parisian Hôtel Costes.

He returned to film in 2004 when he starred in the 2004 film Olé! with Gérard Depardieu. In 2005, he starred as François Pignon in La Doublure (English title "The Valet"), by Francis Veber. In 2006, he appeared opposite Audrey Tautou in Priceless (French title "Hors de prix"), by Pierre Salvadori.

He played the voice of Barry B. Benson in the French version of the 2007 film Bee Movie, Drôle d'Abeille. There he met Jerry Seinfeld and became friends with him.

In 2009, he released the film, Coco, which he directed, wrote and starred in. It opened number one in France, Belgium and Switzerland. In 2010 he appeared in a dramatic role in Roselyne Bosch's The Round Up, which is based on the events surrounding the Vel' d'Hiv Roundup.

In 2011, he had a small role in Woody Allen's Paris-set feature, Midnight in Paris. He also appeared in the motion capture film The Adventures of Tintin: The Secret of the Unicorn, alongside Jamie Bell. The film, which was directed by Steven Spielberg and produced by Peter Jackson, was released on 26 October 2011 in Belgium and on 23 December 2011 in the United States. The same year, he also starred in Jack & Jill as Al Pacino's French cook. In 2012, he had a small role in The Dictator. In 2019 he has a Netflix series, Huge in France, exposing him to a wider American audience. The satiric series includes a cameo by Jerry Seinfeld.

Plagiarism controversy 
On 28 January 2019, the anonymous YouTube channel CopyComic released a video showing various stand-up comedians performing several years prior to several Gad Elmaleh performances, showing similarities that the YouTube channel described as plagiarism. Elmaleh sued the YouTube channel and asked for the videos to be removed from the website, on copyright infringement grounds On 24 September 2019, Elmaleh admitted to have taken inspiration from other artists in some cases, although minimizing the proportion of it among his works :
"We hear things and it infuses you. (...) In what is said to be plagiarism, there is what is fashionable, what we really take, and also the joke that runs, a little easy, that does not belong to anyone ".

Personal life 
Elmaleh lived with French actress Anne Brochet from 1998 to 2002. They have one son, Noé, together. The story of their relationship and break-up was told in Brochet's book Trajet d'une amoureuse éconduite.

From 2009 to 2010, his partner was the French journalist Marie Drucker.

He was in a relationship with Charlotte Casiraghi from December 2011 until June 2015. Their son, Raphaël, was born on 17 December 2013.

He converted to Catholicism in 2022.

Honours 
In 2004, Elmaleh received an award for the best one man show from SACEM in France. In 2006 he received a Crystal Globes Award. by the French Press Association, for best one man show for La Vie Normale.

In 2006 Elmaleh was awarded the Ordre des Arts et des Lettres by the French Minister of Culture Renaud Donnedieu de Vabres.

He was made a Member of the National Order of Quebec by Quebec premier Philippe Couillard in 2017.

Filmography 
 Les soeurs d'Hamlet (1996), plays the role of Hamlet
 XXL (1997) with Catherine Jacob, Michel Boujenah, Gérard Depardieu
 Hi Cousin (1997), plays the role of Allilou
 Vive la République ! (1997)
 Man Is a Woman (1998) with Antoine de Caunes, Elsa Zylberstein
 Train of Life (1998) with Lionel Abelanski, Rufus
 On fait comme on a dit (1999)
 Deuxième vie (2000), plays the role of Lionel
 Dr. Dolittle 2 (2000), French voice of Archie
 Les Gens en maillot de bain ne sont pas (forcément) superficiels (2001), plays the role of Jimmy
 La Vérité si je mens! 2 (2001) with Richard Anconina, José Garcia, Bruno Solo, Gilbert Melki
 A+ Pollux (2002) with Cécile de France
 Chouchou (2003) with Alain Chabat, also screenwriter as Chouchou
 Les 11 commandements (2004) with Michaël Youn as himself
 Ole! with Gérard Depardieu (2005)
 The Valet with Alice Taglioni, Daniel Auteuil, Dany Boon, Virginie Ledoyen, Kristin Scott Thomas (2005)
 Priceless (2006) with Audrey Tautou
 Comme ton père (2007) with Richard Berry
 Bee Movie (2007), French voice of Barry B. Benson
 Coco (2009), also director and screenwriter
 Despicable Me (2010), French voice of Gru
 The Round Up (2010) with Mélanie Laurent, Jean Reno
 Midnight in Paris (2011)
 A Monster in Paris (2011), French and original voice of Raoul
 The Adventures of Tintin: The Secret of the Unicorn (2011) as Omar Ben Salaad
 Jack & Jill (2011), cameo as Chef Xavier
 Happiness Never Comes Alone (2012)
 Capital (2012) with Gabriel Byrne
 The Dream Team (2012) with José Garcia, Jean-Pierre Marielle, Joey Starr
 The Dictator (2012), cameo as a Wadiyan protestor
 Mood Indigo (2013) as Chick
 Despicable Me 2 (2013), French voice of Gru
 The Midnight Orchestra, (2014)
 Minions (2015), French voice of Gru (young)
 Pattaya, (2016)
 Welcome to America (Short), (2017)
 Loue-moi!, (2017)
 Despicable Me 3 (2017), French voice of Gru
 Huge in France (2019),  TV series by Netflix
 Flashback (2021)

Discography

Singles

References

External links 

Gad Elmaleh Quotes

1971 births
20th-century Canadian male actors
20th-century Canadian male writers
20th-century Moroccan Jews
20th-century Moroccan male actors
21st-century Canadian male actors
21st-century Canadian male writers
21st-century Moroccan male actors
Alumni of Lycée Lyautey (Casablanca)
Berber Jews
Canadian emigrants to France
Canadian male film actors
Canadian male stage actors
Canadian male voice actors
Canadian people of Berber descent
Canadian people of Moroccan descent
Canadian people of Moroccan-Jewish descent
Canadian stand-up comedians
Chevaliers of the Ordre des Arts et des Lettres
Converts to Christianity from Judaism
Converts to Roman Catholicism from Judaism
Cours Florent alumni
Jewish Canadian comedians
Jewish Canadian male actors
Jewish male comedians
Knights of the National Order of Quebec
Living people
Moroccan comedians
Moroccan emigrants to Canada
Moroccan emigrants to France
Moroccan male film actors
Moroccan male stage actors
Moroccan male television actors
Moroccan male writers
People from Casablanca